Kelly Eugene Hastings (born June 16, 1961) is a Republican member of the North Carolina House of Representatives. He has represented the 110th district (including constituents in Gaston and Cleveland counties) since 2011.

Career
Hastings served in the U.S. Marine Corps and Reserve. In 1997, Hastings became a realtor. In 2010, Hastings' political career began as a Republican member of the North Carolina General Assembly for the 110th district. In 2010, Hastings was elected to his first term as a member of the North Carolina House of Representatives, representing District 110. Hastings has been re-elected to the seat a total of 5 times, most recently in 2020.

Personal life
In 1986, Hastings earned a BS in Communication, Marketing, Management  from Appalachian State University. Hastings earned a graduate teaching certificate from University of North Carolina at Charlotte. Hastings' wife is Anika, a dentist. They have one child. Hastings resides in Cherryville, North Carolina.

Electoral history

2020

2018

2016

2014

2012

2010

Committee assignments

2021-2022 session
Appropriations (Vice Chair)
Appropriations - Capital (Chair)
UNC BOG Nominations (Chair)
Education - Universities (Vice Chair)
Rules, Calendar, and Operations of the House (Vice Chair)
Energy and Public Utilities
Federal Relations and American Indian Affairs
Redistricting

2019-2020 session
Appropriations (Vice Chair)
Appropriations - Capital (Chair)
Education - Universities (Chair)
Rules, Calendar, and Operations of the House
Energy and Public Utilities
Redistricting

2017-2018 session
Finance (Chair)
Transportation (Chair)
Rules, Calendar, and Operations of the House
Education - Universities
Energy and Public Utilities
Alcoholic Beverage Control
Judiciary III

2015-2016 session
Finance (Chair)
UNC BOG Nominations (Vice Chair)
Alcoholic Beverage Control (Vice Chair)
Education - Universities
Public Utilities
Rules, Calendar, and Operations of the House
Judiciary III
Health
Insurance

2013-2014 session
Appropriations
Homeland Security, Military, and Veterans Affairs (Chair)
Rules, Calendar, and Operations of the House
Transportation
Insurance
Environment

2011-2012 session
Appropriations
Banking (Vice Chair)
Public Utilities
Environment
Commerce and Job Development

References

External links
 Kelly Hastings at gastongop.org
 kellyhastings.com
 Kelly Hastings at powervoter.us

Living people
1961 births
People from Boone, North Carolina
People from Cherryville, North Carolina
Appalachian State University alumni
21st-century American politicians
Republican Party members of the North Carolina House of Representatives